Dacići is a village in the municipality of Rožaje, Montenegro.

Demographics
According to the 2011 census, its population was 364, all but two of them Albanians.

References

Populated places in Rožaje Municipality
Albanian communities in Montenegro